Haskins  is a surname. Notable people with the surname include: 

Alice Haskins (1880–1971), American botanist
Billy Jack Haskins, American football player
Caryl Parker Haskins (1908–2001), American scientist
Charles Haskins (disambiguation), multiple people
Christopher Haskins (born 1937), Irish businessman
Clem Haskins (born 1943), American basketball player and coach
Dennis Haskins (born 1950), American actor
Django Haskins (born 1973), American singer-songwriter
Don Haskins (1930–2008), American basketball coach
Dwayne Haskins (1997–2022), American football player
Dylan Haskins (born 1987), Irish broadcaster
Francine Haskins (born 1947), American illustrator
Fuzzy Haskins (1941–2023), American singer
George Haskins (1915–1991), American legal scholar
Gloria Arias Haskins (born 1956), American politician
Hal Haskins (1924–2003), American basketball player
Hassan Haskins (born 1999), American football player
Hester Jane Haskins (??–1875), American madam
James G. Haskins (1914-1990), politician from Botswana
James Haskins (1941–2005), American author
Jonas Haskins, American bass player
Kevin Haskins (born 1960), English drummer
Kittredge Haskins (1836–1916), American politician
Lee Haskins (born 1983), British boxer
Lola Haskins (born 1943), American poet
Mark Haskins (born 1988), English wrestler
Mark Haskins (soccer) (born 1981), South African footballer
Michael D. Haskins (born 1942), American admiral
Minnie Louise Haskins (1875–1957), British poet
Reginald Haskins (1916–1999), Canadian mycologist
Ron Haskins, American political scientist
Sam Haskins (1926–2009), South African photographer
Sarah Haskins (disambiguation), multiple people
Steve Haskins (born 1958), American golfer
Terry Haskins (1955–2000), American politician
Thomas Haskins (born 1973), American football player
Todd Haskins (born 1972), American soccer player
Tyler Haskins (born 1986), American ice hockey player

See also
Haskin (surname)
Hoskins, surname